Ramon Hotchkiss Durano VI (born February 7, 1969), also known as Red Durano, is a Filipino politician. A member of the Nationalist People's Coalition, he was elected to the House of Representatives of the Philippines in a 2005 special election, succeeding his brother Joseph Ace Durano as the  Representative of the Fifth District of Cebu, following his appointment as Secretary of the Department of Tourism.

He served as the Chairperson of the House Committee on Economic Affairs during the 15th Congress and currently the Chairperson of the House Committee on Basic Education and Culture in the 17th Congress. Additionally, he is also the Vice Chairperson of the House Committee on Inter-Parliamentary Relations and Diplomacy and the House Committee on Ways and Means. He is known as the "Father of Cooperativism" in the Fifth District of Cebu. As a political figure, he is the Party President of the local political party, Barug Alang sa Kauswagan ug Demokrasya (BAKUD). Under his leadership, the party has wielded solid support from among the residents of the 5th District of Cebu which comprises Liloan, Compostela, Carmen, Cebu, Catmon, Cebu, Sogod, Borbon, San Francisco, Poro, Tudela, Pilar and Danao. He has authored various legislation aimed at socio-economic development particularly the reclassification of the Camotes Islands from timberland into alienable and disposable in order to usher in unprecedented economic growth. He has extended assistance to families in need especially during medical emergencies. He allocated appropriations at the Vicente Sotto Memorial Medical Center, Danao Provincial Hospital, Everseley Childs Sanitarium. He also extends scholarship to deserving college students and free skills training through the Technical Education and Skills Development Authority. He has ensured the building of roads and community centers in the 210 barangays of his district.

Red Durano as he is fondly called by the people finished his bachelor's degree from the College of Notre Dame in Belmont, California. He proceeded to take up a master's degree in Business from the Asian Institute of Management. He took over the family business and eventually made his way to public service. He served for three years as the Vice Mayor of Danao from 2013 to 2016.

He is the son of Danao Mayor Ramon "Nito" D. Durano III who also served for nine years as the Congressman of the same district. His grandfather, Ramon M. Durano Sr. also became the Congressman of the district. He comes from a family of public servants dating back to the early American period down to the present.

References
 

People from Cebu
1969 births
Living people
Nationalist People's Coalition politicians
Members of the House of Representatives of the Philippines from Cebu